Krasnogorsky is a rural locality (a khutor) in Amovskoye Rural Settlement, Novoanninsky District, Volgograd Oblast, Russia. The population was 122 as of 2010. There are 2 streets.

Geography 
Krasnogorsky is located 24 km southeast of Novoanninsky (the district's administrative centre) by road. Panfilovo is the nearest rural locality.

References 

Rural localities in Novoanninsky District